Andrée-Anne Côté (born 27 March 1998) is a Canadian synchronized swimmer having been a member of the team since 2016. Côté won a gold medal in the team artistic swimming category at the 2019 Pan American Games. Côté was a training member of Canada's national team in the lead-up to the delayed 2020 Summer Olympics which were postponed as a result of the COVID-19 pandemic.

References

External links 

Living people
1998 births
Canadian synchronized swimmers
Artistic swimmers at the 2019 Pan American Games
Pan American Games gold medalists for Canada
Pan American Games medalists in synchronized swimming
Medalists at the 2019 Pan American Games
Swimmers from Quebec City
Synchronized swimmers at the 2020 Summer Olympics
Olympic synchronized swimmers of Canada